Asaphocrita fuscopurpurella is a moth in the family Blastobasidae. It is found in the United States, including Maryland where the species was described from Plummers Island.

References

Moths described in 1910
fuscopurpurella